Kim Yong-hwan (born 25 May 1993) is a South Korean football full-back who plays for Pohang Steelers.

On 10 October, 2013 when the Brazil national football team went to South Korea to train, Kim joined the training with the Brazil national football team including Neymar, Dani Alves, etc. Kim's main position is full-back, but he can assimilate other positions including wing-back and winger. He has great speed and overlapping ability.

Club career

Early career
Kim went on to Daegun High School, the Incheon United's under-18 team in 2010. In 2012, he graduated Daegun High School and entered Soongsil University. In 2014, after his sophomore year, It was confirmed that he would enter Incheon United.

Incheon United
Kim joined Incheon United in 2014. He made his professional debut against FC Seoul in Korean FA Cup on 30 April 2014 at Seoul World Cup Stadium. In the match, Kim played as a starting line-up. In the 2014 season, when Kim made his debut, he played 14 games in league. In the 2015 season, he played only 3 games (38 minutes) because of his chronic disease. In the 2016 season, he planted himself in the team again. On 24 September 2016, he scored his professional debut goal against Suwon Samsung Bluewings at Incheon Football Stadium. He played 28 games including 22 full-time games and he scored 3 goals. On 5 November 2016, he scored a winning goal against Suwon FC. Incheon United owed confirmation of remaining in the K League Classic to his winning goal.

International career
Kim started his international football team career with the South Korea national under-20 football team in 2013.
He participated in 2013 Toulon Tournament and 2014 Toulon Tournament as a member of South Korea national under-20 football team. He also took part in 2013 FIFA U-20 World Cup. In this competition, Kim played 5 games and was shown a yellow card on 3 July 2013 against Colombia national under-20 football team.

Club career statistics

References

External links 
 

1993 births
Living people
Association football defenders
South Korean footballers
South Korea under-20 international footballers
South Korea under-23 international footballers
Incheon United FC players
Pohang Steelers players
Gimcheon Sangmu FC players
K League 1 players
K League 2 players